Simon Richardson (born 21 June 1983) is a retired elite racing cyclist from Bristol who last rode for .

He started as a cross-country mountain biker and won the 2005 Under-23 British National Mountain Biking Championships.  He became a professional racing cyclist in 2007 and won the overall title in the 2009 FBD Insurance Rás stage race whilst riding for the  team.

Richardson announced his retirement from professional cycling at the end of 2012 after winning the Rouleur’s Combativity award on the final stage of the Tour Of Britain.

Following his retirement, Richardson became a presenter at the Global Cycling Network. He is now working alongside Daniel Lloyd, Manon Lloyd and many other former professional cyclists at GCN.

Major Results

2004
 1st Round of Belgian Cup
 2nd National Under-23 CX Championships
2005
 1st  National Under-23 XC Championships
2006
 1st Bikeline 2 Day
2008
 1st Stage 5 FBD Insurance Rás
 2nd Sea Otter Classic
 3rd Lincoln Grand Prix
 3rd Richmond Grand Prix
 3rd Overall Girvan Stage Race
 3rd Overall Tour of the Reservoir
2009
 1st  Overall FBD Insurance Rás
2010
 1st Tour of the Reservoir

References

1983 births
Living people
English male cyclists
Cross-country mountain bikers
Sportspeople from Bristol
Rás Tailteann winners